The problem of dirty hands concerns whether political leaders and those in similar positions can ever be justified in committing even gravely immoral actions when "dirtying their hands" in this way is necessary for realizing some important moral or political end, such as the preservation of a community's continued existence or the prevention of imminent societal catastrophe. If political actors can be so justified, a paradox or contradiction seems to emerge because it appears that these actors can, or even must, carry out actions that are, ex hypothesi, morally impermissible. Classic examples of situations in which the problem of dirty hands could arise include ticking time bomb scenarios of the kind popularized by the television series, 24. The problem of dirty hands lies at the point where moral philosophy, political philosophy, and political ethics all intersect.

Walzer and Williams on dirty hands
Though the discourse on dirty hands goes back as far as Machiavelli, contemporary philosophical interest in the problem of dirty hands had been revitalized by the works of American political theorist Michael Walzer and other thinkers. The term itself comes from Jean-Paul Sartre's 1948 play Dirty Hands, in which Hoederer speaks of having dirty hands up to his elbows, then asks, "But what do you hope? Do you think you can govern innocently?" but the concept of dirty hands is much older. In Shakespeare's Macbeth, Lady Macbeth is plagued by guilt and believes her hands are covered in blood and in the Bible in Isaiah 59, it reads, "For your hands are defiled with blood, and your fingers with iniquity".

Walzer argued that, in cases of "supreme emergency" in which a political community's continued existence is in imminent danger, its leaders might be obligated to dirty their hands and sanction gravely immoral actions for the sake of saving the community. Discussing the British bombing campaigns against German cities from 1940-1942, Walzer wrote:

British philosopher Bernard Williams explored the problem of dirty hands in less hyperbolic situations, more the everyday necessities of political life than the extraordinary undertakings of defending one's community from outright destruction: "[I]t is a predictable and probable hazard of public life that there will be these situations in which something morally disagreeable is clearly required. To refuse on moral grounds ever to do anything of that sort is more than likely to mean that one cannot seriously pursue even the moral ends of politics".

Martin Hollis on dirty hands 
Martin Hollis, an English philosopher, also wrote about the dirty hands problem. He described the Glencoe Massacre as an example. The act of committing murder under trust was a punishable offense and the order "should not have been given nor, once given, obeyed." However, Hollis points out the utilitarian value of making a "bloody example" as a warning to the other chieftains. He said this was not a question of whether the ends justify the means because the other strategies to unify the nation may have had equally bad consequences. The value of uniting the country makes this a problem of dirty hands because the leaders involved had to make an ethically questionable decision for what they believed would promote the greater good. Hollis argues that politics is the art of compromise, and "the best is the enemy of the good."

Another example of the problem of dirty hands Hollis mentions is the decision Winston Churchill made in World War II not to warn the people of Coventry that the Germans were planning a massive air raid on their city. At first glance it seems wrong that he would send no warning, but had he done so, the Germans would have known that the British had broken their Enigma cypher, which Hollis argues Churchill believed to be a greater loss in the long term.

The problem of dirty hands: Whether it is a paradox or confusion

Bernard Williams regarded as peculiar those morality systems that categorically privilege moral considerations over and above all others: "Ethical life itself is important, but it can see that things other than itself are important. It contains motivations that indeed serve these other ends but at the same time can be seen from within that life as part of what make it worth living".

See also
State of exception (Agamben)—a related concept, the state of exception involves the suspension of the rule of law, which can be compared to the suspension of the rule of morality in "supreme emergencies"
Consequentialism versus deontology

Notes

References
Coady, C.A.J., "The Problem of Dirty Hands". The Stanford Encyclopedia of Philosophy (Spring 2014 Edition), edited by Edward N. Zalta.
Coady, C.A.J., "Tony Coady on Dirty Hands in Politics", on Philosophy Bites. Interview by Nigel Warburton. October 25, 2009.
The International Encyclopedia of Ethics's entry on "Dirty Hands"

Ethics
Political philosophy
Michael Walzer